Shortcrust pastry is a type of pastry often used for the base of a tart, quiche, pie, or (in the British English sense) flan. Shortcrust pastry can be used to make both sweet and savory pies such as apple pie, quiche, lemon meringue or chicken pie.

Shortcrust pastry recipes usually call for twice as much flour as fat by weight. Fat (lard, shortening, butter or full-fat margarine) is rubbed into plain flour to create a loose mixture that is then bound using a small amount of ice water, rolled out, then shaped and placed to create the top or bottom of a pie. Often, equal amounts of butter and lard are used to make the pastry, ensuring that the combined weight of the two fat products is still half that of the flour. The butter is employed to give the pastry a rich flavor, while the lard ensures optimum texture.

Types

 Pâte à foncer is a French shortcrust pastry that includes egg. Egg and butter are worked together with a small quantity of sugar and salt before the flour is drawn into the mixture and cold water is added to bind it.
 Pâte brisée is similar to pâte à foncer, but is lighter and more delicate due to an increased quantity of butter – up to three-fifths the quantity of flour. Very often is made with no sugar, as a savoury crust for pies.
 Pâte sucrée (sweet crust pastry, sweet dough, or sweet paste) is made with more sugar, which sweetens the mix and impedes the gluten strands, creating a pastry that breaks up easily in the mouth. An alternative is a gluten-free pastry.
Pâte sablée has the same ingredients as pâte sucrée, but the butter is creamed with the sugar and the eggs before the flour is folded in. This mixes the butter more evenly, which makes the dough puff much less, creating a more "snappy" and dry pastry, instead of the crumbly texture of the previous doughs. Sablée works better for sweet tarts, tea biscuits, and piped shapes than other short doughs, as they hold their shape much more efficiently, and are the basis for gingerbread and sandwich biscuits. No water is needed, and neither is the dough particularly temperature-sensitive.

Techniques
In preparing a shortcrust, the fat and flour are "cut" into each other, rather than blended, and the ingredients are kept cold. This ensures that the fat remains distinct in the crust, and when it heats during baking, steam is released, resulting in the pockets that make a flaky crust. Water is only added once the fat and flour are thoroughly combined. This ensures that the flour granules are adequately coated with fat and are less likely to develop gluten.

Overworking the dough is also a hazard. Overworking elongates the gluten strands, creating a product that is tough, rather than light and crumbly or flaky. Weak protein flour like cake flour is used for pastry making because it does not become overworked and tough as easily as bread flour.

See also
 List of pastries
 Shortbread

References

Doughs
Pastries
Pies